Clifford Earl Torgeson (January 1, 1924 – November 8, 1990) was an American Major League Baseball player from Snohomish, Washington. A first baseman, he played on five teams for 15 years, from 1947 through 1961. He was known by his middle name, Earl, and his nickname was "The Earl of Snohomish", a nickname originally owned by Baseball Hall of Famer, Earl Averill, also from Torgeson's hometown. In 1950, Torgeson led the National League (NL) with 120 runs scored and in 1957, he led the American League (AL) with a .999 fielding average as a first baseman.

Early years and baseball
Torgeson was born in the lumber town of Snohomish, Washington on New Year's Day of 1924. He attended Snohomish High School and he served in the U.S. Army during World War II from 1943 to 1945. After the war, he played for Seattle in the Pacific Coast League.

Major League baseball
Torgeson's had a lifetime .265 batting average with 149 home runs, 740 RBI and a .989 fielding percentage. His best batting average for a full season was .290 and his highest home run total was 24. In 1959, he helped the White Sox win the American League Pennant. In one game in 1959, during an inning against Kansas City where the White Sox scored 11 runs on one hit, he got a pinch-hit walk.

Torgeson was a regular player for nine years, and he would have been a regular in 1949 if not for a shoulder injury in May and broken thumb in August 1949 (also a broken rib when hit by a pitch in 1950). He played another five years as a role player. As a pinch hitter, as per earlier in his career, his batting eye was key to his value. In , for example, playing out the string for the New York Yankees, he hit only .111 in 18 at-bats, but drew eight walks for a .385 on-base percentage.

Torgeson managed only three total hits in 33 at-bats between the two teams, playing also exclusively as a pinch hitter. The Yankees converted Torgeson from a player to a coach on September 2; the Yankees went on to defeat the Cincinnati Reds in the World Series later that year. Torgeson did not appear in the World Series as a player, but was still part of the team as a coach.

Torgeson also deserves some mention for his base stealing. Although his highest total for a baseball season was only 20, it came during a period in baseball when almost no one stole bases, especially not first basemen. In , with a combined total of 50 stolen bases, the Jethroe-Torgeson duo stole more bases than every other team in the National League, except for the Brooklyn Dodgers.

Personal life and death

Torgeson returned to Snohomish County and served as a county commissioner and later the director of the county Department of Emergency Management. He died of leukemia in Everett, Washington on November 8, 1990. He was 66 years old.

See also
 List of Major League Baseball annual runs scored leaders

References

External links

The Deadball Era

1924 births
1990 deaths
Major League Baseball first basemen
Detroit Tigers players
Chicago White Sox players
New York Yankees players
Philadelphia Phillies players
St. Louis Browns players
Baseball players from Washington (state)
New York Yankees coaches
People from Snohomish, Washington
Minor league baseball managers
Wenatchee Chiefs players
Seattle Rainiers players
Spokane Indians players
Deaths from cancer in Washington (state)
Deaths from leukemia
United States Army personnel of World War II
American expatriate baseball people in Nicaragua